Cabo Juan Román Airport is an airport serving Puerto Aysén, a city at the head of the Aysén Fjord in the Aysén Region of Chile.

The runway is on the east side of the city, alongside the Aysén River. There is mountainous terrain in all quadrants, with nearby hills south and west.

See also

Transport in Chile
List of airports in Chile

References

External links
Puerto Aysén Airport at OpenStreetMap
Cabo 1° Juan Román Airport at OurAirports

Airports in Aysén Region